The Last Empress is a 2018-2019 South Korean television series starring Jang Na-ra, Choi Jin-hyuk, Shin Sung-rok, Lee Elijah, and Shin Eun-kyung. It aired on SBS Wednesdays and Thursdays at the 22:00 KST time slot from November 21, 2018, to February 21, 2019, for 52 episodes.

Originally slated for 48 episodes, The Last Empress was extended to 52 episodes due to its popularity. It received high viewership ratings and positive reviews for its fast-paced and unpredictable plot. On its 24th episode on December 27, 2018, The Last Empress garnered nationwide ratings of 17.9%, making it the highest rating weekday mini-series for Korean terrestrial television in 2018. It surpassed the record previously held by the drama Return.

Synopsis
The Last Empress is set  in an alternate universe, in which Korea is a constitutional monarchy in 2018, Oh Sunny is a bright and vivacious musical actress who marries the Emperor of the Korean Empire. She becomes involved in the palace power struggle and a mysterious murder that sets off events that threaten the monarchy itself, while searching for true love and happiness. She teams up with Na Wang Shik who works as a bodyguard for the imperial family in order to uncover the crimes of the Imperial family. Na Wang Shik started working in the palace to take revenge on the person responsible for his mother's death.

Cast

Main
 Jang Na-ra as Oh Sunny – an aspiring musical actress with a bright and cheerful personality. She became an overnight Cinderella after marrying the Emperor. In the palace, she fights to uncover the truth behind the death of the Grand Empress Dowager and topple the corrupt imperial family.
 Choi Jin-hyuk as Na Wang-sik / Chun Woo-bin – seeks vengeance on the imperial family after his mother's death. To infiltrate the imperial household, he changed his identity to Chun Woo-bin, becoming the Emperor's most trusted imperial bodyguard with unrivaled fighting skills.
 Shin Sung-rok as Emperor Lee Hyuk – Emperor of the Korean Empire. A powerful ruler who is well-respected by the people. He is talented and eloquent, but beneath his pleasant appearance lies an ugly personality.
 Lee Elijah as Min Yoo-ra – Imperial head secretary. She is quick-witted, decisive and greedy. She is trusted by the Emperor and becomes his secret lover and mistress.
 Shin Eun-kyung as Empress Dowager Kang – Lee Hyuk's mother. A fearless and powerful woman who holds absolute authority in the palace and is fiercely protective of her status.

Supporting

Imperial Household
 Oh Seung-yoon as Crown Prince Lee Yoon / Vincent Lee
Younger brother of Lee Hyuk.
 Yoon So-yi as Seo Kang-hee
Ah-ri's nanny, and birth mother.
 Oh Ah-rin as Ah-ri
Illegitimate daughter of Lee Hyuk.
 Park Won-sook as Grand Empress Dowager Jo
 Lee Hee-jin as Princess So-jin
 Shin Go-eun as Late Empress So-hyeon
First wife of Lee Hyuk.

Sunny's Family
 Yoon Da-hoon as Oh Geum-mo
Sunny's father and owner of a chicken restaurant.
 Stephanie Lee as Oh Hel-ro
Sunny's sister.
 Lee Ji-ha as Shin Eun-soo
Sunny's late mother

Others
 Kim Myung-soo as Byun Baek-ho
Father of Empress So-hyeon. Former Chief Imperial Guard.
 Yoon Joo-man as Ma Pil-joo 
Right-hand man of the Emperor.
 Hwang Young-hee as Baek Do-hee
Mother of Na Wang-sik. Adoptive mother of Min Yoo-ra and Na Dong-sik.
 Ha Do-kwon as Chief Imperial guard Joo
 Lee Soo-ryun as Choi Yoon-mi
 Chief Assistant of Empress Dowager Kang
 Kim Min-ok as Hong So-mae
 Chief Assistant of Grand Empress Dowager Jo.
 Choi Ja-hye as Ha Jeong-dan
 Court lady of Grand Empress Dowager Jo.
 Oh Han-kyul as Na Dong-sik
 Kim Yoon-ji as Hyun-joo
Sunny's junior colleague and a fellow musical actress who is jealous of Sunny
 Tae Hang-ho as Na Wang-sik (Ep 1–6)
 Go Se-won as the Prime Minister
 Yoo Gun as Kang Joo-seung
 Kim Jin-geun as the new Prime Minister

Special Appearances
 Park Chan-min as news anchor (Ep 1)
 Yoon Jong-hoon as terrorist who tried to kill the Emperor
Kang Joo-seung's brother (Ep 1)
 Park Gyu-ri as suicidal woman (Ep 13)
 Song Jae-hee as father of Lee Hyuk and Lee Yoon (Ep 14 & 19)
 Jo Dong-hyuk as the detective in Grand Empress Dowager's murder (Ep 17–20)
 Park Doo-shik as Team Lead Hong's son	
 Son Chang-min as Goo Pil-mo, chief neurosurgeon at Daehan Imperial University Hospital (Ep 23–24)
 Kim Da-som as court lady Yang Dal-hee (Ep 28)
 Dong Hyun-bae as the detective (Ep 41–42)
 Ahn Nae-sang as Chief Detective in Lee Yoon's assault (Ep 41–42)
 Jeon Soo-kyeong as Empress Eun (Ep 46–48)
 Kim Soo-mi as Sa Goon Ja/former Chief Kim (Ep 47)

Production
The first script reading for the drama was held on September 6, 2018, at the SBS Ilsan Production Center with the attendance of cast and crew.

Kim Jung-tae was originally cast for the role of Ma Pil-joo. He decided to resign after being diagnosed with liver cancer and was replaced by Yoon Joo-man.

On November 19, 2018, Choi Jin-hyuk suffered an injury while filming an action scene that required 30 stitches on his forehead.

While filming on December 18, 2018, Shin Sung-rok fractured his toe and underwent surgery the following day. He resumed filming activities the day after his surgery.

Due to scheduling conflict, Choi Jin-hyuk was not able to participate filming the 4-episode extension. He completed filming until episode 48 as originally planned.

On February 25, 2019, the production released an epilogue featuring Jang Na-ra and Shin Sung-rok on Naver TV and SBS NOW YouTube channel.

Working condition controversy
On October 25, 2018, SBS signed individual contracts with the staff of The Last Empress to ensure better working conditions. However, according to the Hope Alliance Labor Union (HALU), the network and the production company SM Life Design Group (SMLDG) violated the contracts when they continued to extend work schedules without consent from workers.

The HALU also alleged that, "From November 21 to 30, the staff [of The Last Empress] had to undergo ten consecutive days of intense filming schedules that lasted for many hours without a single day of rest."

On December 17, 2018, HALU filed a bill of indictment with the Ministry of Employment and Labor (MOEL) against SBS and SMLDG.

Original soundtrack

Part 1

Part 2

Part 3

Part 4

Part 5

Part 6

Viewership

Awards and nominations

Notes

References

External links
  

 

Seoul Broadcasting System television dramas
2018 South Korean television series debuts
2019 South Korean television series endings
Korean-language television shows
Television series produced in Seoul
Alternate history television series
Anti-imperialism
Republicanism
Republicanism in Korea
South Korean alternate history
South Korean thriller television series
South Korean romance television series
South Korean mystery television series
Television series by SM Life Design Group
Television shows written by Kim Soon-ok